Dayr Muhaysin was a  Palestinian  village in the Ramle Subdistrict of Mandatory Palestine, located 12 km southeast of Ramla and 4 km west of Latrun.  It  was depopulated during the 1948 Palestine war.

History

Ottoman era
In 1838, it was noted as a  Muslim village in the southern part of the Er-Ramleh area.

In 1863, Victor Guérin found a village of some twenty half destroyed and deserted houses, under a large mimosa tree.

The village was  mentioned in an official Ottoman village list from  around 1870, showing it had 10 houses and a population of 29, though the population count included men only.

In  1883, the "Survey of Western Palestine" found at   Dayr Muhaysin:  "Traces of a former village; a conspicuous white mound, with cisterns and caves; a large site, also known as Umm esh Shukf."

British Mandate era
In the 1931 census of Palestine conducted by the British Mandate authorities, Deir Muheisin had a population of 113; all Muslims, in a total of 28 houses.

In the 1945 statistics, the village had a population of 460 Muslims, while the total land area was 10,008 dunams (equivalent to the Greek stremma or English/American acre), according to an official land and population survey.  Of this, 45 dunams were  plantations or irrigated, 7,909 for cereals,  while 72 dunams were classified as built-up public areas.

1947–1948 war, and aftermath 
In December 1947 the village was evacuated. The Jewish Haganah paramilitary force paved an alternative route from Al-Masmiyya to Latrun, in order not to pass through the Palestinian Arab city of Ramla but the alternative route passed near the village. In the first month of the 1947–48 Civil War in Mandatory Palestine there were attacks on Jewish transportation. In these attacks two high Jewish commanders were killed and according to Israeli historian Yoav Gelber, fear from acts of revenge led the villagers to temporarily   evacuate.

The village was captured on April 6, 1948, during Operation Nachshon. The operational orders were to treat all Arab villages on the  Khulda – Jerusalem corridor as "enemy assembly of jump off places", and such villages were to be destroyed and the villagers expelled. Dayr Muhaysin, Khulda and Saydun were the three first target villages.

In 1951, the Israeli settlement of Beko'a was established on village land, northwest of the village site.

References

Bibliography

External links
Welcome To Dayr Muhaysin
 Dayr Muhaysin, Zochrot
Survey of Western Palestine, Map 20:   IAA, Wikimedia commons 
Dayr Muhaysin,  from the Khalil Sakakini Cultural Center

Arab villages depopulated during the 1948 Arab–Israeli War
District of Ramla